Aleksandr Vladimirovich Zotov (born 27 August 1990) is an association football player who plays as central midfielder or defensive midfielder for FC Rubin Kazan.

Club career
Zotov made his debut for Spartak in the Russian Premier League on 16 November 2008 in a game against FC Luch-Energiya Vladivostok. In November and December 2008, he participated in UEFA Cup games against Dinamo Zagreb, N.E.C., and Tottenham Hotspur. His second league appearance, however, came only on 21 July 2010.

Career statistics

External links
 Player page on the official FC Spartak Moscow website

1990 births
Sportspeople from Khakassia
Living people
Russian footballers
Association football midfielders
Russia youth international footballers
Russia under-21 international footballers
FC Spartak Moscow players
FC Zhemchuzhina Sochi players
FC Tom Tomsk players
FC Spartak-2 Moscow players
FC Shinnik Yaroslavl players
FC Arsenal Tula players
FC Dynamo Moscow players
FC Yenisey Krasnoyarsk players
FC Rubin Kazan players
Russian Premier League players
Russian First League players
Russian Second League players